Andreea Mitu and Monica Niculescu were the defending champions, but Niculescu chose not to participate. Mitu played alongside Patricia Maria Țig, but lost in the first round to Nao Hibino and Alicja Rosolska.

Hibino and Rosolska won the title, defeating Alexandra Cadanțu and Nicola Geuer in the final, 6–0, 6–0.

Seeds

Draw

References 
 Draw

Internationaux Féminins de la Vienne - Doubles